Rockwell is the debut solo album by Anni Rossi, released on March 9, 2009 via 4AD records. It was recorded by Steve Albini at Electrical Audio in Illinois.

Track listing
All songs were written by Anni Rossi.

 "Machine" – 2:31
 "Ecology" – 1:55
 "Las Vegas" – 3:38
 "The West Coast" – 2:36
 "Deer Hunting Camp 17" – 2:49
 "Living In Danger" – 2:30
 "Venice" – 2:36
 "Glaciers" – 2:07
 "Wheelpusher" – 3:12
 "Air Is Nothing" – 2:19

References

External links
Official website

2009 debut albums
Anni Rossi albums
Albums produced by Steve Albini
4AD albums